The Tom Brady–Peyton Manning rivalry was a series of games that took place between 2001 and 2015 involving two quarterbacks in the National Football League (NFL): Tom Brady and Peyton Manning. It is considered by many to be the greatest individual NFL rivalry of all time, and has been compared to other legendary sports rivalries, such as Magic-Bird in basketball, Ali-Frazier in boxing, and Messi-Ronaldo in soccer.

Both quarterbacks are considered to be among the greatest in NFL history. Brady has won seven Super Bowl championships in his career (as well as five Super Bowl MVPs), while Manning won two Super Bowl championships (and one Super Bowl MVP) in his career.  Manning would go on to win five MVP awards in his eighteen-year career, while Brady would win three in his 23-year career. Contrarily,  Both quarterbacks have also made the Pro Bowl fourteen or more times in their careers, and both were selected to the NFL 100th Anniversary All-Time Team in 2019. Brady and Manning are the only starting quarterbacks to win Super Bowls with multiple franchises, and are believed by many as the best NFL players of the 2000s and 2010s.

Background
After Drew Bledsoe was injured in week 2 of the 2001 season, Brady got his first career start against Peyton Manning's Indianapolis Colts, winning the game 44–13. Brady appeared in a record ten Super Bowls (nine with the Patriots, one with the Tampa Bay Buccaneers) and has won a record seven (six with the Patriots, one with the Buccaneers). 

Manning was drafted by the Colts in the 1998 NFL Draft as the number 1 pick, and played for the Colts until the team's final game of the 2010 season, as a neck injury caused him to miss the entire  season. The Colts finished 2–14 that year in his absence and secured the #1 pick in the draft where he became expendable once consensus top prospect, quarterback Andrew Luck of Stanford, was available. During his time with the Colts, Manning led them to two Super Bowls, winning one. On March 20, 2012, after fourteen years with the Colts, Manning signed with the Denver Broncos, for whom he played until his retirement following the  season. He led the Broncos to two Super Bowl appearances, winning Super Bowl 50 in what would be his final game. Like Brady, Manning led his new team to their first Super Bowl win in nearly two decades.

Rivalry

Manning and Brady played each other seventeen times, with Brady winning the head-to-head series 11–6. From 2001 to 2015, the two quarterbacks met at least once every season, except , 2008, and 2011; while Brady's Patriots and Manning's Colts played each other in 2008 and 2011, Brady missed the 2008 season and Manning missed the 2011 season, both due to injuries (Brady with an ACL tear suffered Week 1 and Manning with neck problems). The two quarterbacks did not meet during the 2015 regular season (Brady's Patriots did play Manning's Broncos, but Manning missed the game due to a plantar fasciitis injury), though they met in that year's AFC Championship Game.

Brady led the series in Foxborough 8–2, while Manning led the series in Indianapolis/Denver 4–3.

The two quarterbacks met five times in the NFL Playoffs, in which Manning won three of them (all five were won by the home team, as Brady's two wins both came in Foxborough). Four of the five match-ups were in the AFC Championship Game, with Manning winning three of the four, one of the games with the Colts (2006) and another two with the Broncos (2013, 2015). The winner of each of the playoff match-ups went on to represent the AFC in the Super Bowl. Four of the teams, Brady's 2003 and 2004 Patriots and Manning's 2006 Colts and 2015 Broncos went on to win the Super Bowl, while Manning's 2013 Broncos lost the game.

Outside of football
Manning and Brady participated alongside Tiger Woods and Phil Mickelson in the rematch of The Match: Tiger vs. Phil as a charity fundraiser for COVID-19 pandemic relief.

When Manning was inducted into the Pro Football Hall of Fame in 2021, Brady attended his enshrinement ceremony and quipped on Twitter that he needed "to make sure (Manning's) really done. Can't risk this guy coming back..." Also at the event were Bruce Arians and Tom Moore, both of whom coached Manning in Indianapolis and Brady in Tampa Bay.

Results

|-
| rowspan=2| 
| style="|
| Foxborough
| 
| Brady's first career start.
|-
| style="|
| Indianapolis
| 
| The only season they battled twice in the regular season. Patriots win Super Bowl XXXVI.
|- 
| 
| style="|
| Indianapolis
| 
| Patriots make a goal line stand inside the final minute to preserve the win.
|- style="background:#f2f2f2; font-weight:bold;"
| 2003 playoffs
| style="|
| Foxborough
| 
| AFC Championship Game.  First postseason meeting. Peyton Manning throws 4 interceptions. Patriots win Super Bowl XXXVIII.
|-
| 
| style="|
| Foxborough
| 
| NFL Kickoff Game.
|- style="background:#f2f2f2; font-weight:bold;"
| 2004 playoffs
| style="|
| Foxborough
| 
| AFC Divisional playoffs.  Patriots win Super Bowl XXXIX.
|-
| 
| style="|
| Foxborough
| 
| Peyton Manning's first victory of the series.
|-
| 
| style="|
| Foxborough
| 
| First game featured on NBC Sunday Night Football
|- style="background:#f2f2f2; font-weight:bold;"
| 2006 playoffs
| style="|
| Indianapolis
| 
| AFC Championship Game.  Colts overcome 21–3 deficit, win Super Bowl XLI.
|-
| 
| style="|
| Indianapolis
| 
| Patriots were 8–0 and the Colts were 7–0 entering meeting. Patriots lose Super Bowl XLII.
|-
| 
| style="|
| Indianapolis
| 
| Only regular season home game Manning won. Colts lose Super Bowl XLIV.
|-
| 
| style="|
| Foxborough
| 
| 
|-

|-
| 
| style="|
| Foxborough
| 
| 
|-
| 
| style="|
| Foxborough
| 
| Patriots overcome 24–0 halftime deficit. Only meeting to go into overtime in the history of the rivalry.
|- style="background:#f2f2f2; font-weight:bold;"
| 2013 playoffs
| style="|
| Denver
| 
| AFC Championship Game.  Broncos lose Super Bowl XLVIII.
|-
| 
| style="|
| Foxborough
| 
| Patriots win Super Bowl XLIX.
|-style="background:#f2f2f2; font-weight:bold;"
| 2015 playoffs
| style="|
| Denver
| 
| AFC Championship Game; Broncos win Super Bowl 50.  Manning finished 3–2 in playoff games against Brady.
|-

|-
| Regular season
| style="|
| 
| 
| All four Manning home games were in Indianapolis
|-
| Postseason
| style="|
| 
| 
| Manning was 1–0 in Indianapolis and 2–0 in Denver.  
|-
| Regular and postseason 
| style="|
| 
| 
| Manning was 2–3 in Indianapolis and 2–0 in Denver
|-

Career statistics

Regular season

Postseason

References

2001 beginnings
2016 endings
2000s in North American sport
2000s in the United States
2010s in North American sport
2010s in the United States
Denver Broncos
Indianapolis Colts
Individual rivalries in sports
Peyton-Tom Brady rivalry
National Football League rivalries
New England Patriots
Peyton Manning rivalry